Nélson Diogo Freitas Cunha (born 10 February 1986) is a Portuguese professional footballer who plays for Valadares Gaia FC as a midfielder.

Club career
Born in Guimarães, Cunha was brought up at local Vitória SC, where he spent his entire formative spell save for a loan at neighbouring Amigos de Urgeses. He started his senior career at F.C. Lixa in the third tier, reaching the professionals in the second part of the 2006–07 season with S.C. Olhanense but featuring rarely for the Segunda Liga club. 

After one and a half years in the lower leagues with SC Mirandela, Cunha signed for C.D. Feirense in January 2009, helping them to promote to the Primeira Liga in 2011. He made his debut in the competition on 14 August of that year, starting in a 0–0 home draw against C.D. Nacional. He scored his first goal the following 19 February, opening the 1–1 draw with Olhanense also at the Estádio Marcolino de Castro.

Cunha moved to Moreirense F.C. in the summer of 2013, earning promotion to the top flight in his debut campaign. He subsequently renewed his contract for another year.

References

External links

1986 births
Living people
Sportspeople from Guimarães
Portuguese footballers
Association football midfielders
Primeira Liga players
Liga Portugal 2 players
Segunda Divisão players
Vitória S.C. players
F.C. Lixa players
S.C. Olhanense players
SC Mirandela players
C.D. Feirense players
Moreirense F.C. players
G.D. Chaves players
F.C. Famalicão players
Lusitânia F.C. players
Berço SC players